General Akurathiya Withanage Jagath Crishanthe de Silva, RWP, USP is a former senior Sri Lanka Army officer and military engineer. He had served as the Commander of the Sri Lanka Army, as the Chief of Defence Staff and as the Sri Lankan High Commissioner to the Bangladesh.

Education
Educated at the Royal College, Colombo; De Silva had gained a master's degree in Defence Studies from the National Resilience Institute, Indonesia.

Military career

De Silva joined the Sri Lanka Army as an officer cadet in February 1980 and received his basic training at the Sri Lanka Military Academy. He was commissioned as a second lieutenant in the 1st Field Engineer Regiment, Sri Lanka Engineers in 1981. He gained promotion to the ranks of captain in 1985, major 1989), lieutenant colonel (1994), colonel (1997), brigadier (2003) and major general in November 2009.

He went on to command the 6th Field Engineer Regiment and had served as the brigade commander of the Engineer Brigade, the 51-2 Infantry Brigade and the 56-2 Infantry Brigade. He had served as the commandant of the Sri Lanka School of Military Engineering, the Defence Services Command and Staff College and the Sri Lanka Military Academy. His commands include Commander Forward Maintenance Area, Wanni; Security Forces Headquarters – Kilinochchi and in the Sri Lanka Army General Staff, he had served as additional military secretary, director plans, military secretary and director operations. He had served as colonel commandant of the Corps of Sri Lanka Engineers and was a member of military delegations to Malaysia and China. He served as commander of Sri Lanka Army Volunteer Force (SLAVF) before taking up appointment in 2013 as Chief of Staff of the Sri Lanka Army. In 2014, he was appointed deputy chief of mission in the Sri Lankan embassy in Moscow. In February 2015, he was appointed Commander of the Army and promoted to the rank of lieutenant general. In June 2017 he was promoted to the rank of general and appointed as Chief of Defence Staff and served till August 2017.

He is a graduate of Staff College, Camberley, and the Nanjing PLA Army Command College. He has attended the bomb disposal course at the College of Military Engineering, Pune, Engineer Company Commanders' Course at the Military College of Engineering, Pakistan, the Higher Command Course at the Army War College, Mhow, and the Advanced Security Cooperation Executive Course at the Asia-Pacific Center for Security Studies.

Later work
Following his retirement, he was appointed Sri Lankan High Commissioner to the Bangladesh and served till 2019.

Awards and decorations
He has been awarded the Rana Wickrama Padakkama (RWP), Uttama Seva Padakkama (USP), the Sri Lanka Armed Services Long Service Medal, the Purna Bhumi Padakkama and the North and East Operations Medal.

 

His badges include: the Sri Lanka Engineers Badge, the Explosive Ordnance Disposal Badge and the De-mining Badge..

References

External links
Commander of the Army

|-
 

Commanders of the Sri Lanka Army
Sri Lankan full generals
Sri Lankan military engineers
Alumni of Royal College, Colombo
Sri Lanka Military Academy graduates
Living people
Year of birth missing (living people)
Sinhalese military personnel
Sri Lanka Engineers officers
Army War College, Mhow alumni